Ernst Johan Emanuel Hallberg (5 January 1894 – 28 April 1944) was a Swedish Army officer and horse rider who competed in the 1928 and 1932 Summer Olympics. In 1928 he and his horse Loke finished 25th in the individual jumping and won a bronze medal with the Swedish jumping team. Four years later he finished fifth in the individual jumping on Kornett and in the individual eventing on Marokan.

Hallberg was major in the Swedish Army.

References

1894 births
1944 deaths
Swedish Army officers
Swedish show jumping riders
Swedish event riders
Olympic equestrians of Sweden
Swedish male equestrians
Equestrians at the 1928 Summer Olympics
Equestrians at the 1932 Summer Olympics
Olympic bronze medalists for Sweden
Olympic medalists in equestrian
Medalists at the 1928 Summer Olympics